P.L. Sivanappan known by his stage name credited as Peeli Sivam (5 July 1938 – 25 September 2017) was an Indian actor who featured around 400 Tamil-language films and plays from 1958 to 2017. He has featured in several films such as Muhammad bin Tughluq (1971) Malligai Poo (1973), Doorathu Idi Muzhakkam (1980), Poi Saatchi (1982),Mundhanai Mudichu (1983), Imaigal (1983), Azhagan (1991), Ejamaan (1993), Vetri Vinayagar (1996) and many more. He has also acted in television shows. In 1995, he was conferred the Kalaimamani award from the state of Tamil Nadu for his contributions in the field of drama.

Early life 
Born in a small hamlet, Pudupeerkadavu, near Bannari – Erode District, Tamil Nadu, Sivanappan had a passion for acting in his childhood days which later grew to the extent when he was brought to the limelight of stage plays by none other than Puratchi Thalaivar M.G.Ramachandran to pursue his career in stage plays and later on carried on to silver screen and small screen. He has co-starred in films with likes of film legends MGR and Sivaji Ganesan. Peeli Sivam belongs to the generation of actors who hailed from the Tamil theater. He has acted in many stage plays.

Career 
He had pursued acting as his profession and was into stage plays with his affiliation to stage troupes like National Theatres (R.S.Manohar), Seva Stage (S.V.Sahasaranamam), Manoramma troupe (Manoramma), Stage Friends (Komal Swaminathan) until mid 1970s. Later he switched his professional career to Silver screen and Small Screen and actively continued his profession until 2012.

Films 
He has appeared in over 200 films as a supporting actor, villain character roles. He has played lead role in Thoorathhu Idi Muzhakkam alongside Vijayakanth and performed key roles in Cho's Tughlaq and K.Bhagyaraj's Poi Saatchi, Mundhanai Mudichu.  He had been acting on numerous Tamil serials and sops. He has also acted in many films with Captain Vijayakanth like Captain Prabakaran, Nenjile Thunivirunthaal, Periya Marudhu, including the latter's debut directorial venture Virudhagiri.

Television 
Peeli Sivam ventured into small screen space and acted in many Doordarshan plays earlier and later in TV serials, Idhu Oru Kadhal Kathai (2005). He was also cast on STAR Vijay's drama soap, Kana Kaanum Kaalangal (2006). His TV career hit a new limelight with his character as Annanchi in AVM's Vaazhkai and later Periyappa in Vikatan Televistas's Thirumathi Selvam. He portrayed the role of Annamalai in the Tamil soap opera, Uravugal (2009), which was aired on Sun TV.

Awards 
He is the recipient of the 2009 Tamil Nadu Government Lifetime Achievement Award.  He won the Kalamamani Award from the State of Tamil Nadu for best actor in the field of drama in 1995. He has many more laurels against his name such as Kalai Chelvam and many more.

Death 
Peeli Sivam died on 25 September 2017, at the age of 79.

Filmography 
This is a partial filmography. You can expand it.
Films

1970s

1980s

1990s

2000s

2010s

Television Serials
 Aachi International (1997-1998)
 Oru Pennin Kadhai (1998-2000)
 Vaazhkai (TV series) (2000-2001) as annachi
Vazhndu kattukiren (TV series)(2001-2002)
 Aasai (2002-2003) as Aasha's father
 Sorgam(2003-2006) as James Thangaraj
Idhu Oru Kadhal Kadhai(2005)
 Kana Kaanum Kaalangal (2006-2009)
 Paasam (TV Series)(2007-2008)
 Thirumathi Selvam (2007-2010) as Narayanan (Periyavar)
 Comedy Colony (2009) as Jayashree's Father
 Sollathan Ninaikiren(2009-2010)
 Uravugal (2009-2012)
 Mohini (2014-2015)

References 

People from Erode district
1938 births
2017 deaths
Male actors in Tamil cinema
Indian male film actors